Bernard Pershey (born in Joliet, Illinois) is an American drummer and record producer.

Biography 
Pershey began playing drums at the age of 8. In his early years he was part of many psychedelic rock and hard rock bands such as Trilogy, White Lightning, This Oneness, Brainiac and Madame X.

During the 70s and 80s he was a session drummer for acts like Olivia Newton-John, Henry Gaffney, Chuck Berry, Michael Thompson, Jennifer Batten, Glenn Meganck, Dwight Twilley, Pat Vidas Flight and many more.

In 1988 he joined Edgar Winter for 2 years. His drumming on the song Frankenstein" is featured in the Tina Turner biopic What's Love Got to Do with It. In 1992 he joined blues Walter Trout's band for worldwide tours and 9 albums, until he left in 2001 and joined Eric Burdon and replaced Aynsley Dunbar. From 2001–2005 he was a touring member of Burdon, incl. Dean Restum, Dave Meros (of Spock's Beard) and his old friend Martin Gerschwitz (who was also in Trout's band).

From 2002 to 2005 he was also a member of Beth Hart, which he left to play exclusive for Burdon, before Burdon parted ways with his band members soon after to form a new band. Pershey played of Hart's Leave The Light On.

From 2008 to 2010 he performed with the blues musician Eric Sardinas and his band Eric Sardinas and Big Motor. The Eric Sardinas band is a three piece power blues outfit, with Sardinas on guitar, Levell Price on bass, and Pershey on drums. This line up had toured in support of the band's latest CD Eric Sardinas and Big Motor.
 From 2010 to 2013 he worked live with jazz guitarist Bob Summers, and with Martin Gerschwitz and Friends, Keston and The Rhythm Killers, and others.

 In 2016 he recorded with singer Billy Trudel. Also in 2016 he recorded drums for the album "The Streets Cry Freedom" by Eddie St. James, which has been re-released on the Rivet/Sony-Orchard label.

 In 2017, he recorded drums for The Surf Dawgs, with Zip Caplan, on the record 'Beyond The Horizon", on Big Wave Records. He also played drums on a Recording for Seth Phillips, produced by Tim Andersen.
 
 In 2020 and 2021, he did live performances with Iron Butterfly, and Uncle Zeek, although the schedule was curtailed by the Covid pandemic.

Pershey has produced music for the Chicago Producers Circle, and partnered Dean Restum at Mustang Brothers Productions, as well as recording drum tracks and client demos at the Bad Jack Studios in Arcadia, California, which he now owns. He also currently works with Cabin Fever, Keston and the Rhythm Killers, Bobby Gray, and others., Bernie Pershey News"</ref>

References

Press release: "Bernie Pershey leaves Walter Trout"

External links
 
Bernie live with Eric Sardinas/Germany on YouTube
Live with Eric Burdon / TV-Festival- Sat1, Germany on YouTube

American drummers
Record producers from Illinois
Living people
Musicians from Joliet, Illinois
Year of birth missing (living people)